Orbitz.com is a travel fare aggregator website owned by Orbitz Worldwide, Inc.

Orbitz may also refer to:

Orbitz (drink) a short-lived 1990s soft drink
Orbitz 300, the 2007 stock car race

See also
Orbit (disambiguation)